Jarlinson Pantano Gómez (born 19 November 1988) is a former racing cyclist from Colombia, who rode professionally between 2012 and 2019 for the ,  and  teams.

Career
He competed in the 2014 Giro d'Italia. In December 2014 he was announced as part of the squad for the  team for 2015. He raced in the 2015 Tour de France, finishing in 19th place. Pantano was the winner of the fifteenth stage of the 2016 Tour de France, on a mountain stage across the Grand Colombier, from Bourg-en-Bresse to Culoz.

In July 2016 he replaced Nairo Quintana for selection in the individual road race at the Rio de Janeiro Olympics.

Pantano agreed a two-year extension of his contract in 2018, through 2020.

Adverse analytical finding and doping ban
In April 2019,  announced that Pantano had been 'immediately suspended' from the team after being notified that he had returned an adverse analytical finding (AAF) for EPO in a doping test carried out on 26 February. As a result of the AAF, he was provisionally suspended from the sport by the UCI, the sport's international governing body. In June 2019, he announced his retirement from professional racing.

In May 2020, a UCI tribunal banned Pantano for four years, backdated to his initial provisional suspension, meaning he is unable to compete until April 2023.

Major results

2008
 2nd Overall Grand Prix Guillaume Tell
 5th Overall Ronde de l'Isard
 7th Overall Tour de l'Avenir
2009
 1st Stage 5 Coupe des nations Ville Saguenay
 8th Overall Cinturón a Mallorca
2010
 3rd Overall Tour de l'Avenir
 4th Overall Cinturón a Mallorca
2011
 1st Stage 7 Vuelta a Colombia
2014
 1st  Mountains classification Tour Méditerranéen
 7th Gran Premio di Lugano
 7th Roma Maxima
 9th Overall Settimana Internazionale di Coppi e Bartali
2015
 9th Overall Tour Down Under
2016
 Tour de France
1st Stage 15
 Combativity award Stages 17 & 20
 4th Overall Tour de Suisse
1st Stage 9
 5th Gran Premio di Lugano
 8th Overall Volta ao Algarve
2017
 National Road Championships
1st  Time trial
2nd Road race
 10th Overall Tour of Turkey
2018
 1st Stage 5 Volta a Catalunya

Grand Tour general classification results timeline

References

External links

1988 births
Living people
Colombian male cyclists
Sportspeople from Cali
Colombian Tour de France stage winners
Cyclists at the 2016 Summer Olympics
Olympic cyclists of Colombia
Doping cases in cycling
Colombian sportspeople in doping cases
Tour de Suisse stage winners
21st-century Colombian people